6 Cathedral Street is an historic building in Dunkeld, Perth and Kinross, Scotland. It is two storeys, with an inscribed lintel reading "17 JS JC 25".

Water Wynd, which leads to the River Tay, separates this building and number 8.

See also 
 List of listed buildings in Dunkeld And Dowally, Perth and Kinross

References 

Cathedral Street 6
Category B listed buildings in Perth and Kinross
1725 establishments in Scotland